Dan Bern (1997) is the self-titled debut full album of the Iowa native singer/songwriter Dan Bern.

Songs

"Jerusalem" 
At the end of "Jerusalem", the singer reveals that he is the messiah. The song opens and closes with the lyrics "When I tell you that I love you don't test my love / Accept my love / Don't test my love / 'Cuz maybe I don't love you all that much."

The song has been covered by folk singer-songwriter Ani DiFranco. It has been featured in the weather section of the podcast Welcome to Night Vale.

Track listing
All tracks composed by Dan Bern

"Jerusalem" – 3:44
"Go to Sleep" – 2:33
"Wasteland" – 	6:38
"Marilyn" – 2:51
"King of the World" – 2:48
"Too Late To Die Young" – 2:58
"Rome" – 5:54 
"I'm Not the Guy" – 3:32
"Never Fall in Love" – 3:12
"Estelle" – 7:33
"Queen" – 3:13

Personnel 
Dan Bern – Organ, Guitar, Harmonica, Cello, Vocals, Art Direction, Illustrations, Paintings
Jennifer Condos – Bass
Mick Haggerty – Art Direction, Photography
Mouse Johnson – Engineer
Gary Mallaber – Drums
Stephen Marcussen – Mastering
Chuck Plotkin – Percussion, Handclapping, Producer
Dean Restum – Guitar, Engineer
Micajah Ryan – Engineer
Toby Scott – Mixing
Marshall Thompson – Keyboards
Josh Zawaduk – Organ, Accordion, Sound Effects, Vocals

References

1997 debut albums
Dan Bern albums
Work Records albums
Albums produced by Chuck Plotkin
Albums produced by Toby Scott